The Nannup Branch Railway, also known as the Wonnerup to Nannup Railway, was a branch line of the Western Australian Government Railways (WAGR) between Wonnerup and Nannup.

History

In 1897 the Jarrah Wood and Saw Mills Company leased the W.A. Timber Company's former timber concession in the South West of Western Australia. The section of the W.A. Timber Company's Ballaarat Tramway route south of the Bunbury-Busselton railway was reused by the Jarrah Wood and Saw Mills Company for the construction of a railway between Wonnerup and Jarrahwood in 1898–99.

The line operated until 1903, and was bought by the WAGR in 1907. Residents in the Nannup region were advocating for the extension to the railway in 1905 and in 1909 the Jarrahwood to Nannup line was completed and opened.

The line was closed in 1984. A re-commissioning study was conducted in 1989 but did not result in the reinstatement of the railway.

Rail Trail
While the rails have been lifted, the rail corridor is still owned by the Government, through the Public Transport Authority.
The section between Jarrahwood and Nannup has been converted to the Sidings Rail Trail and forms part of the Munda Biddi Trail.

Notes

Closed railway lines in Western Australia
Railway lines closed in 1984
Railway lines opened in 1909